Antidotum (English: Antidote) is the tenth and last studio album by the Polish musical group 2 Plus 1, released in 1989 by Tonpress. It was their first studio album in four years, and didn't match the success of previous LPs. In 2003, Antidotum was reissued on CD by Agencja Artystyczna MTJ.

Track listing 
Side A:
 "Niech w tobie gra coś pięknie" – 4:10
 "Ameryka cię zje" – 3:25
 "Niespokojna kołysanka" – 3:45
 "Za mało życia" – 3:40
 "Chłodnym okiem" – 4:15

Side B:
 "Ocalę cię" – 3:55
 "Rock antidotum" – 4:20
 "Przyciąganie ziemskie" – 3:55
 "Londyński pub" – 4:15
 "Oszczędzaj serce" – 2:05

Personnel 
2 Plus 1:
 Elżbieta Dmoch – vocals
 Janusz Kruk – vocals, guitar, keyboards
 Cezary Szlązak – vocals, saxophone, keyboards

Accompanying musicians:
 Jerzy Kossacz – keyboards
 Janusz Koman – keyboards
 Paweł Serafiński – synthesizer
 Maciej Latański – bass guitar

References

External links 
 Antidotum on Discogs

1989 albums
2 Plus 1 albums
Polish-language albums